Brígida Baltar (1959/1960 – 8 October 2022) was a Brazilian visual artist. Baltar worked with actions, sculpture, and drawings among other media. She was interested in capturing the ephemeral in her artwork.

Life and career

Brígida Baltar was born in 1959 in Rio de Janeiro, Brazil, where she lived and worked. Her career began in the 1990s, often working with primordial elements, such as the material she took from her own house in the neighbourhood of Botafogo. In recent years, Baltar's work was shown in institutions throughout Brazil and in the United States, Japan and Argentina, and other countries. She also took part in important group shows, such as The Peripatetic School – Itinerant Drawing From Latin America (2011), which premiered at the Drawing Room in London, and then toured to several other venues.

She participated in important Biennials, such as the I Biennial of the Americas, Denver (USA) (2010); 25a Bienal Internacional de São Paulo (2002); V Bienal de la Habana (1994); and 12a Bienal do Mercosul (2020). Her work is featured in important public collections such as MOCA Cleveland (USA); Blumenthal Collection (Boston, USA); MIMA Museum (Middlesbrough, United Kingdom); Coleccíon Copel, CIAC (México); Pinacoteca do Estado de São Paulo (São Paulo, Brazil); MAC-USP, Museu de Arte Contemporânea USP (São Paulo, Brazil); Itaú Cultural (São Paulo, Brazil); Fundação Joaquim Nabuco (Recife, Brazil); and the Museu de Arte Moderna do Rio de Janeiro (Brazil).

Baltar died from leukemia on 8 October 2022, at the age of 62.

Works
Baltar's artistic career began in the 1990s and crossed many different mediums. Baltar started from her home, where she would gather drops of rain seeping through openings in her roof, mixed with dusts from the clay bricks of her house.

In 2005, Baltar had to leave her house in the Rio de Janeiro district of Botafogo. During the fifteen years that preceded this event, the artist had lived and worked almost in a symbiosis with the old brick building. In Abrigo (1996), she carved the form of her body into the wall of the house and then entered that space. She ground up many of the red bricks from that house and used that as the medium for future drawings and sculptures.

Baltar strove to return to a pre-industrial, childlike and primitive narration.’ Baltar's artistic production began in the 1990s with the so-called small poetic gestures, developed in her studio-home in Botafogo.

In her work, Collecting Mist (1998–2004), which was shown at the New Museum, Baltar photographically captures herself in the Sisyphean task of trying to capture mist.

Baltar has had her work exhibited at LAMB Arts in São Paulo, Casas Riegner in Bogota, Bergamin & Gomide in São Paulo, Drawing Room in London, the Embassy of Brazil in London, Spencer Brownstone Gallery in New York, and Carbono Galeria in São Paulo. Her works are greatly influenced by the practices of the Brazilian Neo-Concrete artists Lygia Clark and Hélio Oiticica. According to Baltar she wanted to criticise the contemporary world of productivity surplus, that allows little room for daydreaming, for contemplation, etc.

Exhibitions 
 2001
 Virgin Territory, the National Museum of Women in the Arts, Washington.
 O Fio da Trama, El Museu del Barrio, Nova York / Museu de arte Latinoamericano Buenos Aires MALBA
 Get that Balance, Kampnagel KulturFabric, Hamburg, Germany
 Neue Kunst in Hamburg 2001, Kunsthaus, Hamburg, Germany
 Outra Coisa / Projeto Agora, Museu Ferroviário Vale do Rio Doce, Vitória,Brazil.
 Filmes de artistas / Cinema Capacete e FestRio, Rio de Janeiro, Brazil
 Die Rio Video, curated by Hans Christian Dany- Kunstverein Hamburg, Germany.
 Espaço Agora / Capacete, Rio de Janeiro, Brazil
 Galeria Nara Roesler, São Paulo, Brazil
 2002
Museum of Contemporary Art Cleveland, Ohio, USA
 Galeria Filomena Soares, Lisbon, Portugal
 Julia Friedman Gallery, Chicago, US
 Museu Dragão do Mar, Fortaleza, Brazil
 Artefoto, Centro Cultural Banco do Brasil, Rio de Janeiro/Brasília, Brazil
 Bienal Internacional de São Paulo, São Paulo, Brazil
 Brígida Baltar / Michel Blazy, curated by Sabine Schaschal, Kunsthaus Baselland.
 C’est pas du cinéma, Studio Fresnoy Nacional des Arts Contemporains, France
 Air from the other planets, Film Festival Oberhausen, Germany
 Laura Marsiaj Arte Contemporânea, Rio de Janeiro, Brazil
 Caminhos do Contemporâneo, 1952/2002, Paço Imperial, Rio de Janeiro, Brazil
 Final Frontier, Spencer Brownstone Gallery, New York, USA
 Banca 2, Cinema Capacete e Festival de Inverno do Rio de Janeiro, Brazil
 Love's House, lapa, Rio de Janeiro, Brazil
 2003
 Art Basel Miami Beach, Diana Lowenstein Fine Arts, Miami, Florida, US
 Art unknown, Arco project room, Madrid, Spain
 Grande Orlândia, Rio de Janeiro, Brazil
 Fotoarte 2003, Espaço Cultural Contemporâneo Venâncio ECCO, Brasília, Brazil.
 Latinarte Gallery, Miami, Florida, USA
 Paper works, Julia Friedman Gallery, Chicago, Illinois, USA
 Nuit de la science Geneve, Musée d’histoire des sciences, Geneva, Switzerland
 Casa de Abeja, Instituto Cultural Brasil Colombia, Bogotá, Colombia
 Museu de Arte Moderna de Recife, Brazil
 Paço Imperial, Rio de Janeiro, Brazil
 Galeria Laura Marsiaj, Rio de Janeiro, Brazil
 2004
 Palm Beach Contemporary, Diana Lowenstein Fine Arts, Palm Beach, Florida, US
 Brazil: Body Nostalgia, The National Museum of Modern Art Tokyo, Japan
 2005
 Ainda Utopias, Laura Marsiaj Arte Contemporânea, Rio de Janeiro, Brazil (solo)
 Em Casa, Casa da Ribeira, Natal, Rio Grande do Norte, Brazil (solo)
 Arte Brasileira Hoje, Museu de Arte Moderna, Rio de Janeiro, Brazil 
 Untitled, Santa Barbara Contemporary Arts Forum, Santa Barbara, California, US
 São Francisco Bayennale, San Francisco, US
 O corpo, Itaú Cultural, São Paulo, Brazil
 L’autre Amerique, Passage de Retz, Paris, France
 2006
 Paralela, Pavilhão Armando de Arruda Pereira, São Paulo, Brazil
 Desenho Contemporâneo Brasileiro, MCO Arte Contemporânea, Porto, Portugal
 Draw-Drawing-2, The Foundry Gallery, London Biennale 2006, UK
 Um Céu Entre Paredes /An Indoor Heaven, Firstsite, Colchester, UK (solo)
 2007
 Contraditório, Panorama Brasileiro de Arte Contemporânea, Museu de Arte Moderna de São Paulo, Brazil
 Mais Precioso do que Prata, Centro Cultural da Caixa, Rio de Janeiro, Brazil
 Pó de Casa, Galeria Nara Roesler, São Paulo, Brazil (solo)
 Entre Paredes, 713 Arte Contemporânea, Buenos Aires, Argentina (solo)
 In search of the miraculous, University Gallery of Essex, Colchester, UK
 Itaú Contemporâneo, Brasil 1980–2007, Itaú Cultural, São Paulo, Brazil
 Anos 80/90 Modernos e Pós-Modernos, Instituto Tomie Otake, São Paulo, Brazil
 Karma International, Zurich, Switzerland
 Passagem Secreta, Projeto Respiração, Fundação Eva Klabin, Rio de Janeiro, Brazil
 Incisão, Centro Cultural Banco do Nordeste Cariri, Ceará, Brazil
 Resplandores, Recoleta, Buenos Aires, Argentina
 2008
 Arte e música, Paisagens sonoras Caixa Cultural Brasília, DF, Brasil
 Masamerica, Canal Mediateca, Caixa Forum, Barcelona, Spain
 Estranha coletiva, Galeria Durexart, Rio de Janeiro, Brazil
 Leveza e aspereza da linha, Galeria Nara Roesler, São Paulo, Brazil
 Contradictorio, Panorama de Arte Brasileiro, Alcalá, Madrid, Spain
 Sertão Contemporâneo, Caixa Cultural do Rio de Janeiro, Rio de Janeiro, Brazil
 Paper trail, 15 Brazilian Artists, Allsopp Contemporary Gallery, London, UK
 Mão Dupla, Sesc Pinheiros, São Paulo, Brazil
 2012 
 SAM Art Project, in Paris, France; 
 O amor do pássaro rebelde, at Cavalariças, Escola de Artes Visuais do Parque Lage (EAV Parque Lage), in Rio de Janeiro, Brazil (solo)
 2016
 International Series: Contemporary Artists from Brazil, at Turchin Center for the Visual Arts, in Boone, USA.
 2017
 Neither-nor: Abstract Landscapes, Portraits and Still Lives, at Terra-Art Project, in London, UK
 2018
 A carne do mar, at Galeria Nara Roesler, in São Paulo, Brazil
 Abstracción textil \ Textile Abstraction, at Galería Casas Riegner, in Bogotá, Colombia
 2019 
 Filmes at Galeria BNDES (solo) 
Dois vídeos, at Galeria Gustavo Schnoor 
 Universidade Estadual do Rio de Janeiro (UERJ), in Rio de Janeiro, Brazil; 
 I Remember Earth, at Magasin des Horizons, Centre d'arts et de cultures, in Grenoble, France
 Studiolo XXI – Desenhos e afinidades, at Fundação Eugénio de Almeida Centro de Arte e Cultura, in Évora, Portugal

References

External links
Brígida Baltar at Nara Roesler
Os pequenos momentos de Brígida Baltar em mostra de filmes no BNDES
Courage to take flight

Date of birth missing
Year of birth uncertain
2022 deaths
20th-century Brazilian women artists
21st-century Brazilian women artists
21st-century Brazilian artists
Brazilian contemporary artists
Brazilian photographers
People from Rio de Janeiro (city)
School of Visual Arts alumni
Artists from Rio de Janeiro (city)
Deaths from leukemia
Deaths from cancer in Brazil